The Danish Speedway League or Danish Super League or Metal League as it is called today is the top division of motorcycle speedway in Denmark.

Roll of Honour 
List of teams to have finished in medal-winning positions:

2008 season 
The 2008 season was won by Slangerup; they beat Esbjerg and Holsted.

2009 season

2015 season

In the Superfinal Munkebo won with 36 points. Fjelsted finished second with 33 points, Esbjerg third with 32 points and Region Varde forth with 31 points.

2016 season

In the Superfinal Region Varde won with 40 points. Holsted finished second with 37 points, Esbjerg third with 35 points and Slangerup forth with 20 points.

References

See also 
 Sports in Denmark

Speedway in Denmark
Speedway leagues
Professional sports leagues in Denmark